Jalalpur Jattan is a city in Gujrat District in the province of Punjab, Pakistan. It is the centre of Jalalpur Jattan Tehsil and about 50 km from Kashmir.

History 
When Alexander the Great defeated King Porus, he established two towns: one near the Jehlum River, and another near the Chenab River. The latter, present-day Jalalpur Jattan was named Shaklanagar, an amalgamation of Greek and Sanskrit words meaning "the city of beauty". These cities were settled by people from Alexander's multinational armies, which included a majority of Greeks. These Indo-Greek cities and their associated realms thrived long after Alexander's departure. Later, when Jalal ud din Firuz Khalji and his forces stayed here to suppress the invasion of Mongols, he renamed the city Jalalabad after himself. The name was once again changed to Jalalpur Jattan by the notable Jatts of their time, said to be Zabardast Khan and Ajmer Khan.

During the Sikh Empire, the town gained significant importance. There is a place in Jalalpur Jattan built by Chandragupta Maurya in 300 BC.
Local historians believe that Chandragupta had built a fort in Salamgarh, a suburban village of Jalalpur Jattan. The original name of the village could not be ascertained but the fort became famous as Islamgarh Fort with the passage of time. The fort of Islam Garh had remained under Aurangzeb Alamgir, Ahmed Shah Abdali, and Ranjit Singh and their forces. The fort had been the mint of Maharaja Ranjit Singh of Lahore in 1832. Only some deteriorated remains of the fort exist today.

There is also an ancient city within the territories of the city, now a town known as Kulachor. Excavations in the area revealed that Kula Chor was the mint of the Maurya Dynasty.

In 1908, Jalalpur Jattan was made a municipality or municipal committee, the fully representative body. The city was granted tehsil status in November but it still in process due to lack of interest. 2016.

Climate 

The town has moderate climate. The average temperature of the city is 23.9 °C. During the peak of summer, the daytime temperature shoots up to 45 °C, but the hot spells are relatively short due to the proximity of the Azad Kashmir mountains. During the winter, the minimum temperature may fall below 2 °C. The rainfall in the city is remarkable, with precipitation even during the parched months. The average rainfall is 802 mm.

Economy 

The city is famous for its cottage industry of textile and its local sweets called Khatai. Jalalpur Jattan connects Gujrat with multiple cities through the Jalalpur–Gujrat Road.

Jalalpur Jattan is head office of the Sadar Circle Gujrat.

Cantonment
Jalapur Jattan has a small cantonment area, which has its importance due to its proximity with the line of control and important strategic cities of Azad Kashmir like Chamb, Kot Jamil and important headworks of river Chenab such as Head Marala.

Notable people

Ejaz Durrani, Actor 
Rajendra Krishan, Songwriter

See also 
Jalalpur–Gujrat Road
Jalalpur Jattan Tehsil
Jalalpur Jattan Tehsil
Ranewal

References 

Populated places in Gujrat District